Banneville-la-Campagne War Cemetery is a Second World War cemetery of Commonwealth soldiers located close to the commune of Banneville-la-Campagne,  east of Caen, Normandy, France. The graveyard contains 2,175 graves of which 140 are unidentified The cemetery is maintained by the Commonwealth War Graves Commission.

History
During the Allies push out of the Normandy bridgeheads, Operation Goodwood and the liberation of Caen were undertaken in July 1944. During August, the Falaise Gap was closed. The majority of the soldiers interred in the cemetery date from these attacks. Of the 2,175 soldiers in this cemetery there are 2,150 Britons, 11 Canadians, 5 Australians, 2 New Zealanders, 5 Poles and two unidentified soldiers.

Notable graves
 Reginald John Whistler – British artist, designer and illustrator
 Eddy Kahn – Dutch athlete
 John Thornton – British athlete

Location
The cemetery is located close to Sannerville, in the Calvados department of Normandy, on the Route de Caen (D.675).

See also
 List of military cemeteries in Normandy
 American Battle Monuments Commission
 UK National Inventory of War Memorials
 German War Graves Commission

References

Further reading
 Shilleto, Carl, and Tolhurst, Mike (2008). A Traveler's Guide to D-Day and the Battle of Normandy. Northampton, Mass.: Interlink.

External links
 

World War II memorials in France
World War II cemeteries in France
British military memorials and cemeteries
Commonwealth War Graves Commission cemeteries in France
Canadian military memorials and cemeteries
1944 establishments in France
Cemeteries in Calvados (department)